The 1996–97 Czech 2. Liga was the fourth season of the 2. česká fotbalová liga, the second tier of the Czech football league.

League standings

Top goalscorers

See also 
 1996–97 Czech First League
 1996–97 Czech Cup

References

 Official website 

Czech 2. Liga seasons
Czech
2